Protein Z (PZ or PROZ) is a Protein in humans which is encoded by the PROZ gene.

Protein Z is a member of the coagulation cascade, the group of blood proteins that leads to the formation of blood clots. It is a glycoprotein. Protein Z functions to inhibit blood coagulation by binding to an inhibitor. It is a GLA domain protein and thus Vitamin K-dependent, and its functionality is therefore impaired in warfarin therapy.

Physiology 

Although it is not enzymatically active, it is structurally related to several serine proteases of the coagulation cascade: Factors VII, IX, X and Protein C. The carboxyglutamate residues (which require Vitamin K) bind Protein Z to phospholipid surfaces.

The main role of Protein Z appears to be the degradation of Factor Xa. This is done by Protein Z-related protease inhibitor (ZPI), but the reaction is accelerated 1000-fold by the presence of Protein Z. Oddly, ZPI also degrades Factor XI, but this reaction does not require the presence of Protein Z. ZPI activated by Protein Z does not appear to happen because of its conformation, but proximity to each other. When Protein Z in bound to ZPI, it will bind to the same phospholipid surface as Factor Xa. This is what promotes the inhibition of Factor Xa.

In some studies, deficiency states have been associated with a propensity to thrombosis. Others, however, link it to bleeding tendency; there is no clear explanation for this, as it acts physiologically as an inhibitor, and deficiency would logically have led to a predisposition for thrombosis.

Genetics 

It is 62 kDa large and 396 amino acids long. The PROZ gene has been linked to the thirteenth chromosome (13q34).

It has four domains: a GLA-rich region, two EGF-like domains and a trypsin-like domain. It lacks the serine residue that would make it catalytically active as a serine protease.

History 

Protein Z was first isolated in cattle blood by Christopher Prowse and Peter Esnouf in 1977, and Broze & Miletich determined it in human plasma in 1984. Protein Z found in humans was given the same name as the one found in cattle for a few reasons. When looking at these isolated proteins it was found that they both have similar molecular weight, a similar composition of amino acids, and a similar Amino Terminal sequences. These similarities in molecular composition of the protein found in cattle and humans was great enough that it can be concluded they were the same protein. When Protein Z was first discovered, it was theorized to be a form of Factor X instead of its own individual protein. Research had to be done to isolate this protein to find out if it was a form of Factor X or not. To test this, Vitamin K dependents were removed from the sample by adsorption to barium citrate, then an ion exchange chromatography was performed. This process showed that there was no Factor X in the isolated protein. The purified Protein Z in this experiment was distinct from Factor X, proving it was a separate protein.

Structure 

Structural analysis of Protein Z will allow better understanding of its function. The Ramachandran plot for Protein Z indicates it will form alpha helices. The final structure, all alpha domain, was determined by x-ray diffraction. It consists of chain A and B, which are both helix-loop-helix motifs. The secondary structures of this protein are color coded in the image in the top left; pink represents the strands, yellow represents alpha helices and white is the coils.

Health 
There are many reasons that Protein Z is important to our bodies and our health. In pregnancy it is vital that the protein is functioning correctly. It has been found that if it isn't functioning correctly, it can lead to fetal death or hypersensitive disorders in pregnancy. This happens because when the levels of this protein drop too low, it can lead to fetal growth restrictions. Another possible effect is having a high sensitivity to this protein which could correlate with diabetes. In women diagnosed with ovarian cancers, it was found the protein was inhibiting Factor Xa which happens because there is a lower regulation of this protein in cancer cells.

References

External links 
 Human Protein Reference Database

Coagulation system